Novozheyevka is a rural locality (a khutor) in Kletnyansky District, Bryansk Oblast, Russia. The population was 9 as of 2010. There is 1 street.

Geography 
Novozheyevka is located 19 km northwest of Kletnya (the district's administrative centre) by road. Staraya Marmazovka is the nearest rural locality.

References 

Rural localities in Kletnyansky District